This is a list of hills in Devon. Many of these peaks are important historical, archaeological and nature conservation sites, as well as popular hiking and tourist destinations in the county of Devon in southwest England.

Colour key

The table is colour-coded based on the classification or "listing" of the mountain or hill. The types that occur in Devon are Marilyns, HuMPs and TuMPs, listings based on topographical prominence. "Prominence" correlates strongly with the subjective significance of a summit. Peaks with low prominences are either subsidiary tops of a higher summit or relatively insignificant independent summits. Peaks with high prominences tend to be the highest points around and likely to have extraordinary views.

A Marilyn is a hill with a prominence of at least 150 metres or about 500 feet. A "HuMP" (the acronym comes from "Hundred Metre Prominence) is a hill with a prominence of at least 100 but less than 150 metres. In this table Marilyns are in beige and HuMPs in lilac. A "TuMP" as defined here is a hill with a prominence of at least 30 but less than 100 metres. The term "sub-Marilyn" or "sub-HuMP" is used, e.g. in the online Database of British and Irish Hills to indicate hills that fall just below the threshold. To qualify for inclusion, hills must either be 400 metres or higher with a prominence of at least 30 metres, below 400 metres with a prominence of at least 90 metres (the threshold for a sub-HuMP) or be in some other way notable.

For further information see the Lists of mountains and hills in the British Isles and the individual articles on Marilyns, HuMPs, and TuMPs; by way of contrast, see also the article listing Tumps (a traditional term meaning a hillock, mound, barrow or tumulus).

List of mountains and hills 
In the UK and Ireland, a mountain is usually taken to be at least 2,000 feet high. By that definition, Devon has two mountains: High Willhays and Yes Tor.

See also 
 List of mountains and hills of the United Kingdom
 List of Marilyns in England

Notes 
 Parts of Dartmoor are military training areas which means the peaks in these areas are only accessible to the public at certain times.
 The following summit(s) have been omitted from the table as they are sub-peaks, as per the UIAA definition or alternative names of hills in the main list:
 Whitehorse Hill (601m), Dartmoor, subpeak of Hangingstone Hill 600 m to the N.

References and footnotes 

 
Devon
Hills